is a Japanese football player. He plays for FC Osaka.

Career
Yuto Maeda joined J3 League club AC Nagano Parceiro in 2017. On June 21, he debuted in Emperor's Cup (v FC Tokyo).

Club statistics
Updated to 22 February 2019.

References

External links

Profile at Nagano Parceiro

1994 births
Living people
Kyoto Sangyo University alumni
Association football people from Hyōgo Prefecture
Japanese footballers
J3 League players
Japan Football League players
AC Nagano Parceiro players
FC Osaka players
Association football midfielders